Ein Shams  is a 2007 film.

Synopsis 
From once being the capital of Egypt during the Pharaonic era and a sacred location marked by the visit of Jesus and the Virgin Mary, Ein Shams has become one of Cairo's poorest and most neglected neighbourhoods. Through the eyes of Shams, an eleven-year-old girl who lives in this neighbourhood, the film captures the sadness and magic that envelops everyday life in Egypt. In a series of heart-rending events, the diverse characters of the film showcase the intricacies of Egypt's political system and social structure, and give a glimpse into the grievances of the Middle East region and the complex relationships of its nations.

Awards 
 Taormina 2008 
 Cine árabe Róterdam 2008 
 Cartago 2008

References 

 

2007 films
Egyptian independent films
Moroccan drama films
Egyptian drama films